Collins Iyare Idehen Jr. (born 1983), better known as Colion Noir, is an American gun rights activist, lawyer, and host of the web series NOIR.

In 2013, the National Rifle Association (NRA) recruited him to appear in NRA News videos in subsequent months. Later that year, he appeared at its convention in Houston. Since then, he has become the NRA's "most prominent black commentator," as The Guardian described him in 2017.

Early life 
Noir was born Collins Iyare Idehen, Jr. in Houston, Texas, to immigrants from Nigeria, the son of an executive chef father and a registered nurse mother. As an only child, Noir spent his formative years in Houston, Texas.

Education
Noir graduated from high school in Houston. He earned a political science degree from the University of Houston and a J.D. degree from the Thurgood Marshall School of Law at Texas Southern University, also in Houston. He first became interested in firearms while a student at the Thurgood Marshall School of Law.

References

External links
 
 YouTube Channel

Living people
American gun rights activists
YouTubers from Texas
African-American lawyers
People from Houston
American lawyers
Year of birth uncertain
Place of birth missing (living people)
University of Houston alumni
Thurgood Marshall School of Law alumni
American people of Nigerian descent
1983 births
21st-century African-American people
20th-century African-American people